Myconus is a genus of achilid planthoppers in the family Achilidae and the type genus of the subfamily Myconinae and tribe Myconini; species have been recorded from South America and East Africa.

Species
The following belong to the genus Myconus:
 Myconus collaris Melichar, 1904 c g
 Myconus conspersinervis (Stål, 1862) c g
 Myconus jacquelinae Bahder & Bartlett, 2022
 Myconus trivittatus Fennah, 1950 c g
 Myconus uniformis (Metcalf, 1938) c g
Data sources: i = ITIS, c = Catalogue of Life, g = GBIF, b = Bugguide.net

References

Further reading

 
 
 
 
 

Achilidae
Auchenorrhyncha genera